This article shows all participating team squads at the 2013 Women's Pan-American Volleyball Cup, played by twelve countries over June, 2013 in Lima, Callao, Iquitos, Huacho, in Peru.

























References

P
P